The Night may refer to:

Books
Al-Lail (“The Night” or “Night”), the ninety-second sura of the Qur'an

Film
 The Night (1992 film) (Al-Lail), a 1992 film by Syrian filmmaker Mohammad Malas
 La Notte (The Night), a 1961 Italian film
 The Night (2020 film), a film by Iranian-American filmmaker Kourosh Ahari

Music
 "The Night", an indie dance group formed by members of Nero

Albums
 The Night (album), an album by Morphine

Songs
 "The Night" (Frankie Valli and The Four Seasons song)
 "The Night" (The Animals song), 1983
 "The Night" (Disturbed song), 2008
 "The Night" (Goodnight Nurse song), 2008 
 "The Night" (Valerie Dore song), 1984
 "The Night" (Scooter Song), 2003
 "The Night", a song by Basshunter from The Old Shit album
 "The Night", a song by Heart from Brigade
 "The Night", a song by Hell on Wheels
 "The Nights", a song by Swedish DJ Avicii

Other uses

 The Night (painting), by Max Beckmann c. 1919

See also 
 Night, the period of time when the sun is below the horizon
 Night (disambiguation)
 Nights (disambiguation)